The Revin Pumped Storage Power Plant is located in northern France, near Revin in the department of Ardennes and the Belgian border. The pumped storage power plant, commissioned in 1976, is owned by Électricité de France (EDF) and has a nameplate capacity of 800 megawatts (MW). Measured by capacity, it is the third largest pumped storage power plant in France.

Characteristics 
Revin Pumped Storage Power Plant was constructed as an underground power station: Four Francis turbines which are used for both generating and pumping with a capacity of 200 MW each are located in a 115 m long, 17 m wide and 16 m high cavern. Four transformers are installed on the surface to connect the generators (13 kV) to the electrical grid (400 kV).

There are three reservoirs which are connected to the Revin Pumped Storage Power Plant.

The upper and lower reservoirs are separated by a vertical distance of 250 m.

See also 

 Renewable energy in France

References 

Pumped-storage hydroelectric power stations in France
Buildings and structures in Ardennes (department)
Underground power stations
Energy infrastructure completed in 1976
20th-century architecture in France